Trude Storelvmo is a Norwegian meteorologist who is a professor at the University of Oslo. She specializes in atmospheric science and studies the impact of aerosols and clouds on the climate of the Earth. She was awarded a European Research Council Starting Grant in 2018. She serves as editor-in-chief of Global and Planetary Change.

Early life and education 
Storelvmo earned her doctorate at the University of Oslo. After completing her PhD she moved to Switzerland, where she worked as a postdoctoral researcher at the ETH Zurich.

Research and career 
Storelvmo was appointed to the faculty at Yale University in 2010. She returned to Norway in 2010, when she was appointed professor of meteorology and oceanography at the University of Oslo. That year Storelvmo was awarded a European Research Council Starting Grant. Her research considers mixed-phase clouds and their role in weather and climate. Mixed-phase clouds can contain both liquid and ice. 

Storelvmo contributed to the IPCC Sixth Assessment Report, and is editor-in-chief of Global and Planetary Change.

Awards and honors 
 2015 National Science Foundation CAREER Award
 2017 American Meteorological Society Young Scientist award 
 2020 University of Oslo Young Researcher award

Selected publications

References 

Norwegian meteorologists
Year of birth missing (living people)
Living people